Vijaya Natheswarar Temple is a Hindu temple situated in the village of Thiruvijayamangai in the Thanjavur district of Tamil Nadu, India.

Location 

Thiruvijayamangai is situated at a distance of 4 kilometres from Thiruppurambiyam in Thanjavur district and 11 kilometres from Kumbakonam.

History 

The temple was constructed by the Medieval Cholas in accordance with contemporary Chola designs.

Shrines 

The presiding deity is Shiva and the consort is Mangalanayaki or Mangalambikai. There are smaller shrines to Ganesha, Dakshinamoorthy, Surya and Chandra.

Significance 

According to the Indian epic Mahabharatha, while Arjuna was meditating upon Shiva seeking the Pasupata weapon on the advice of Krishna, the demon Mookasura attacked him. At once, Arjuna shot an arrow at him. Meanwhile, Shiva had also arrived at the spot along with Parvati in the guise of a hunter and shot Mookasura. Both then argued as to whose arrow had shot Mookasura dead when Arjuna violently struck Shiva causing tremors in the three worlds. Impressed with Arjuna's strength, Shiva reverted to his normal self and bestowed upon him the Pasupata weapon which was crucial to his victory in the Kurukshetra War.

References 

 

Shiva temples in Thanjavur district
Padal Petra Stalam